Church of the Holy Trinity is a historic Anglican church located near Ridgeland, South Carolina, Jasper County, South Carolina.  It was built in 1858, and is a Carpenter Gothic-style church. The Gothic Revival style features include the asymmetrical composition, the wheel window, the buttressed tower, and board and batten sheathing.  It features a three-staged bell tower.

It is a member of the Anglican Diocese of South Carolina in the Anglican Church in North America. It was added to the National Register of Historic Places in 1982.

References

Churches on the National Register of Historic Places in South Carolina
Carpenter Gothic church buildings in South Carolina
Churches completed in 1858
19th-century Episcopal church buildings
Buildings and structures in Jasper County, South Carolina
National Register of Historic Places in Jasper County, South Carolina
Anglican Church in North America church buildings in the United States
Former Episcopal church buildings in South Carolina
Anglican realignment congregations